Henry Fromanteel Lytton-Cobbold, 3rd Baron Cobbold (born 12 May 1962), is a British screenwriter. He is the current occupant of Knebworth House in Hertfordshire, England.

He is the son of David Lytton-Cobbold, 2nd Baron Cobbold, and succeeded his father in the Cobbold barony in May 2022. He is married to Martha Boone, with two children, Morwenna Gray and Edward. He is a great-great-great-grandson of novelist Edward Bulwer-Lytton.

Trained as a screenwriter, Lytton-Cobbold was an assistant to the filming of The Shooting Party, part of which was filmed at Knebworth House, and subsequently worked on Water. From 1987 until 1993, he lived in Los Angeles, and scripted several TV shows, including Lake Consequence. He returned to Britain and lived in Knebworth village until 2000, when he took over the daily running of Knebworth House from his father. He continued to practise his trade during this period, scripting Night of Abandon, an episode of the Red Shoe Diaries, in 1997.

In 2008 he engaged in – and won – a debate with Scott Rice, founder of the Bulwer-Lytton Fiction Contest, a bad-writing contest sponsored annually by San Jose State University, on the subject of the literary reputation of his ancestor Bulwer-Lytton. The debate took place in Lytton, British Columbia, named after the novelist; the mayor made it clear that the town was backing the Bulwer-Lytton side.
In 2017 Lytton-Cobbold published a two-volume book about Emily Bulwer-Lytton, the daughter of his ancestor Edward Bulwer-Lytton.

Publications
Henry Lytton Cobbold and Mary Letitia Greene: In the Bosom of Her Father - The Life and Death of Emily Bulwer Lytton, complete illustrated edition in two volumes, Knebworth 2017,

References

1962 births
British male screenwriters
Cobbold family
Living people
People educated at Eton College
3
People from Knebworth
Henry
Alumni of the University of Kent